Roy O. Young (September 11, 1917 – May 5, 1987) was an American football offensive lineman in the National Football League (NFL) for the Washington Redskins.  He played college football at Texas A&M University and was drafted in the seventh round of the 1938 NFL Draft.  While playing with the Texas A&M Aggies, Young was named to the All-Southwest Conference team in 1936 and 1937.  After playing for the Redskins for 1938, he retired from football and became a professional boxer.

After retiring from sports, Young became a doctor and moved to Scottsdale, Arizona.  He died on May 5, 1987.

References

External links
 

1917 births
1987 deaths
American football offensive linemen
Texas A&M Aggies football players
Washington Redskins players
People from Abbeville, Louisiana
Players of American football from Louisiana